Godwin Enakhena is a Nigerian sports journalist and analyst. He currently serves as the Director of Sports of Mountain of Fire and Miracles Ministries ( M.F.M)

Recognition 
In 2014, Godwin Enakhena was awarded the Sports Journalist of the year Radio at the Nigeria Sports Awards ceremony which was held at the Muson Centre, Onikan, Lagos .

References 

Living people
Ambrose Alli University alumni
Year of birth missing (living people)
People from Edo State
Nigerian sports journalists